Robyn Johnson (born 7 December 1990) is a South African field hockey player for the South African national team.

Johnson made her senior international debut for South Africa in 2017, during a test series against Zimbabwe in Durban. She participated at the 2020 Summer Olympics.

References

External links

1990 births
Living people
South African female field hockey players
Field hockey players at the 2020 Summer Olympics
Olympic field hockey players of South Africa
Field hockey players at the 2022 Commonwealth Games
21st-century South African women
2023 FIH Indoor Hockey World Cup players